Francisco Javier Michea Michea (born December 24, 1978 in Combarbalá, Chile) is a former Chilean footballer and current coach of Deportes Vallenar of the Chilean Segunda División.

Teams
He played for the following teams.
  Regional Atacama 1996-1998
  Deportes Copiapó 1999-2000
  Deportes Ovalle 2001-2003
  Naval 2004
  O'Higgins 2005
  Deportes Copiapó 2006-2007
  Coquimbo Unido 2008
  Deportes Copiapó 2009–2011

References

 Profile at BDFA 
 

1978 births
Living people
Chilean footballers
Coquimbo Unido footballers
Deportes Copiapó footballers
O'Higgins F.C. footballers
Deportes Copiapó managers
Chilean Primera División players
Primera B de Chile players
Association footballers not categorized by position